Tuesta is a village and council located in the municipality of Valdegovía/Gaubea, in Álava province, Basque Country, Spain. As of 2020, it has a population of 74.

Geography 
Tuesta is located 33km west of Vitoria-Gasteiz.

References

Populated places in Álava